Spetsnaz is a 2002 Russian TV miniseries directed by Andrei Malyukov.

Overview
The series is set mostly in Russia and follows the adventures of four (initially six) members of the Spetsnaz. The locations also switch frequently and have also included Chechnya, Afghanistan, Dagestan, and Kosovo.

Through the course of the series, the characters have done everything from rescuing shot-down pilots in Chechnya to rescuing the passengers and crew of a hijacked Aeroflot plane grounded in Afghanistan.

Cast
The following are recurring characters in the show
Aleksandr Baluyev as Major 'Klim' Platov, the hardened veteran unit commander
Aleksei Kravchenko as Captain 'Doc' Vyazemsky
Vladislav Galkin as Senior Lieutenant 'Yakut' Urmanov
Igor Lifanov as Senior Warrant Officer 'Khrust' Khrustalyov  
Vladimir Turchinsky as Lt. Col. Ozornykh
Aleksandr Nosik as Senior Warrant Officer 'Zmey' Kobrin
Andrei Zibrov as Warrant Officer Aleksey 'Shakh' Shakhmametyev

Ban

In October 2014 the Ukrainian State Film Agency banned some Russian films, particularly Spetsnaz, for demonstration and distribution. According to the head of the agency Pylyp Illenko, that decision was caused by events in Ukraine which has made it "improper to show Russian films with obvious propaganda, for example, exaltation of Russian law enforcement and Russia itself, on Ukrainian TV channels now."

References

External links
Unofficial website 

2002 Russian television series debuts
2002 Russian television series endings
Chechen wars films
Russian military television series
Russian television miniseries
2000s Russian television series
Channel One Russia original programming
Action television series